Eel Girl is a 2008 horror science fiction short film written and directed by Paul Campion, in which what appears to be a sort of human-eel hybrid woman, being studied by scientists in a Naval research facility, takes revenge on one of the scientists who is studying her.

The film was produced by Elisabeth Pinto and Jennifer Scheer, and was shot in Wellington, New Zealand. The special makeup effects were created by New Zealand-based company Weta Workshop.

Plot
Deep in a secret navy research facility, an armed security officer enters a secure observation room, filled with electronic monitoring equipment and shelves full of dissected fish specimens. The officer requests one of the scientists accompany her immediately. He protests, quoting navy protocols that require two people to remain in the room at all times, but the officer makes sure he knows he has no choice.

The remaining scientist watches them leave the facility on a security monitor. Satisfied he's on his own, he quickly begins to activate override commands on the computer. A warning begins to sound, and the scientist steps back to stand in front of a large observation window, which looks into a dark tiled and dirty room, in the center of which stands a large bath, filled with a black viscous liquid. Opposite the window is a large secure door, above which warning lights flash red, then green. The scientist becomes more agitated, breathing heavily, as he sees the door open, and a webbed hand curls around the door frame.

Out of the darkness appears the Eel Girl, naked, her skin pale, with gills visible in her cheeks, and small fins on her forearms. Slowly she steps into the room, walks around the bath. The scientist watches as she slides into the thick black liquid. In the observation room the computer begins to flash warnings. Distracted by the computer, the scientist doesn't notice the Eel Girl climb slowly out of the bath. She steps up to the window, places her hands against the glass and looks through. The scientist sees her, moves to the window, and places his hands against hers through the glass. She stares back, mouth opening and closing slowly, revealing rows of sharp teeth.

She signals with her eyes, and the scientist moves to the security door that connects his room to hers. He activates the security code and opens the door. Inside she is waiting for him. He walks into the room and embraces her. She reaches up, gently holds the back of his head with one hand. Suddenly her jaw extends and she shoves his head into her mouth, then lifts him into the air and swallows him whole, vomiting his shredded clothes. She climbs back into the bathtub and lies there, caressing her now massively enlarged belly, and the scientist inside still alive.

Awards

2012 Shocker Award - Knoxville Horror Film Festival, United States
2009 Honorable Mention - Best Short Film, Philadelphia Independent Film Festival, United States
2009 Best Director, Landcrab Film Festival, England
2009 Best Special Effects, Landcrab Film Festival, England
2009 Best Special Effects, Backseat Film Festival, United States
2009 Sci-Fi London Horror Award, London Short Film Festival, England
2008 Canal+ Cocette Minute, Brest European Short Film Festival, France
2008 Grand Prix, Court Metrange Short Film Festival, France
2008 Best Special FX, Rhode Island Horror Film Festival, United States
2008 Best Visual Effects, A Night of Horror Film Festival, Australia
2008 Best Special Effects, Dark Carnival Film Festival, USA
2008 Best Fx, Eerie HorrorFilm Festival, USA
2008 Best Super Short, Shriekfest Film Festival, USA
2008 Best Visual Effects, Tabloid Witch Awards, USA
2008 Honorable Mention, Tabloid Witch Awards, USA
2008 Best Short Film, HP Lovecraft Film Festival, USA
2008 Best Special Effects, HP Lovecraft Film Festival, USA
2008 Best Comedy, HP Lovecraft Film Festival, USA

Nominations

2009 UK Film Council Award for Best Film, London Short Film Festival, England
2008 Outstanding Technical Achievement in a Short Film, Qantas Film and Television Awards, New Zealand
2008 Best Short Film, Rushes Soho Shorts Film Festival, England
2008 Best Cinematography, Dark Carnival Film Festival, USA
2008 Best Special Effects, Terror Film Festival, USA
2008 Best Music Score, Terror Film Festival, USA

Festival screenings

2008 London International Festival of Science-Fiction and Fantastic Film.
2008 Shriekfest Los Angeles
2008 Israel Fantastic Film Festival, Tel-Aviv
2008 Evergreen Film Festival, Korea
2008 Ravenna Nightmare Fest, Italy
2008 Fancine Film Festival, Malaga, Spain
2008 Amberg Horror Festival, Germany
2008 Terror Film Festival
2009 Tabloid Witch Awards
2008 Brest European Film Festival
2008 Rio de Janeiro International Short Film Festival
2008 Leeds International Film Festival, England
2008 San Sebastian Horror & Fantasy Film Festival, Spain
2008 Court Metrange Film Festival, France
2008 Sitges Film Festival, Catalonia, Spain
2008 Dark Carnival Film Festival
2008 HP Lovecraft Film Festival
2008 Rhode Island International Film Festival, USA
2008 PiFan, South Korea
2008 Fantasia Film Festival, Montreal, Canada
2008 Fright Night, USA
2008 Dragon*Con, USA
2008 The San Francisco Short Film Festival, USA
2008 Homegrown Film Festival, New Zealand
2008 Rushes Soho Shorts, London, England
2008 Show Me Shorts, New Zealand
2008 Seattle True Independent Film Festival, USA
2008 A Night of Horror Film Festival, Sydney, Australia
2008 Fantastic Fest, Austin, Texas, USA
2009 London Short Film Festival, England
2009 Amsterdam Fantastic Film Festival
2009 Brussels Fantastic Film Festival
2009 Dresden International Short Film Festival
2009 Worldwide Short Film Festival, Toronto, Canada
2009 OneDotZero
2010 BoneBat Comedy of Horrors Film Festival, Redmond, WA, USA
2017 Desert Flower Art Bar Mini Short Film Festival, Big Spring, Texas, USA
2017 Dusk Till Dawn Horror Fest, Dixon, Illinois, USA
2017 Short Sounds Film Festival, Bournemouth, England
2020 Nosferatu Film Festival, Doncaster, England

See also
Harpya
Jenifer (Masters of Horror episode)
Shambleau
Tomie

External links

2008 independent films
2008 films
New Zealand independent films
2000s monster movies
2000s science fiction horror films
New Zealand science fiction horror films
Fictional human hybrids
2000s English-language films